Odilo Lothar Ludwig Globocnik (21 April 1904 – 31 May 1945) was an Austrian Nazi and a perpetrator of the Holocaust. He was an official of the Nazi Party and later a high-ranking leader of the SS. Globocnik had a leading role in Operation Reinhard, the organized murder of around one and a half million Jews, of mostly Polish origin, during the Holocaust in the Majdanek, Treblinka, Sobibor and Belzec extermination camps. Historian Michael Allen described him as "the vilest individual in the vilest organization ever known". Globocnik killed himself shortly after his capture and detention by British soldiers.

Early life and ancestry
Odilo Lothar Ludwig Globočnik was born on 21 April 1904 in the Imperial Free City of Trieste, then the capital of the Austrian Littoral administrative region of the Austro-Hungarian Empire (now in Italy). He was the second child of Franz Globočnik, a Slovene cavalry lieutenant in the Austro-Hungarian Army. Because Globocnik was a leading Nazi official, and perpetrator of not only the Holocaust but the ethnic cleansing of millions of Poles and other Slavs, historians have been interested in accounts of Globočnik's Slavic ancestry (his surname is Slovenian). In his 2004 biography of Globocnik, historian Joseph Kranjc devoted the entire first chapter to the debate concerning Globocnik's ancestry. He says that Globocnik was ridiculed by other Nazis for his surname, because the Nazis classified Slavs as sub-human (Untermenschen). Senior Nazis such as Heinrich Himmler defended him, saying that he was of Aryan origin and that his surname was a result of Slavicization.

His father was unable to save enough money required to get an officer's marriage permission and had to leave the service. As was the practice at this time, he was given a job in the Imperial and Royal Mail. Odilo's mother Anna, née Petschinka, was born in Versecz, Kingdom of Hungary (now Vršac, Serbia); she was half-Serbian and half-Croatian. In 1914, the family left Trieste for Cseklész, where Franz Globočnik was recalled to active duty after the outbreak of the First World War.

The same year, Globočnik joined the army, via a military school. The war ended his military education prematurely. Odilo moved with his family to Klagenfurt in Carinthia. There as a teenager, he joined the pro-Austrian volunteer militia fighting Slovene volunteers and, later, the Yugoslav Army during the Carinthian War (1918–19). In 1920, he worked as an underground propagandist for the Austrian cause during the Carinthian Plebiscite.

He later enrolled at the Höhere Staatsgewerbeschule (a higher vocational school for mechanical engineering), where he passed his Matura (the Austrian equivalent of the German Abitur) and graduated with honours. He worked as a porter at the railway station, among other jobs, to help financially support his family.

Globocnik first became politically active in 1922, when he became a prominent member of pre-Nazi Carinthian paramilitary organisations and was seen wearing a swastika. At the time, he was a building tradesman, introduced to his job while engaged to Grete Michner. Her father, Emil Michner, had talked to the director of KÄWAG (Kärntner Wasserkraftwerke AG), an electricity distribution company of Carinthia, and secured Globocnik a job as a technician and construction supervisor.

After he entered politics, Globocnik faced ridicule from the German and international media for his Slavic surname, in light of the Nazis' (including Globocnik's) extreme racism against Slavs. Globocnik would assiduously maintain that he was of Germanic ancestry. This was important since Slavs were considered sub-human (Untermenschen) and eventually subjugated to genocide by Nazi Germany. He said that his paternal grandfather was an "Aryan" who was culturally Slavicized, but maintained his Germanic blood. Historians have often dismissed this as a ruse. But historian Joseph Popzeczny argued in his 2004 biography of Globocnik that the story was true, citing Austro-Hungarian census data from 1910 indicating that the Globocniks were ethnic Germans.

Nazi Party and SS career

In August 1933, Globocnik was arrested for the first time, for his attempt to contact imprisoned Nazis in Klagenfurt. In the same year, he became a member of the Austrian SS. He was arrested because of his public support for the Nazi Party (NSDAP), as he had become a member of the party in 1931 while he was in Carinthia. Although he was arrested four times between 1933 and 1935, he served just over a year in jail. Heinrich Himmler intervened on his behalf, after two years of arguments between Globocnik and the authorities.

His first documented activity for the NSDAP occurred in 1931 when he was documented as distributing propaganda for the party. By this point, he had nearly abandoned his work as a building tradesman, and attached himself very closely to the NSDAP. He was assigned to develop a courier and intelligence service for the NSDAP, which channelled funds from the German Reich into Austria. In June 1933, in Vienna, Jewish jeweller  was killed when a bomb was thrown at his shop. This was among the earliest murders in Austria attributable to the Nazis, and a number of historians believe that Globocnik was involved in the attack.

Globocnik joined the Schutzstaffel (SS) on 1 September 1934. His devotion to the Nazi cause paid off, as he was quickly promoted in the party apparatus in Austria. He became a Deputy Gauleiter briefly in Vienna and then in Carinthia between January and May 1933. He was appointed as the head of the party intelligence apparatus in Carinthia, serving from 1934 to 1936. From September 1936 to May 1938, he served as the Chief of Staff of the National Leadership of the Austrian Nazi Party under Hubert Klausner.

Globocnik was a key player in the usurpation of the Austrian government by the Nazis. With the Anschluss, Nazi Germany annexed Austria on 12 March 1938.

Globocnik was rewarded with an appointment as a State Secretary in the Nazi government, established by Chancellor Arthur Seyss-Inquart on 15 March. On 10 April 1938, he was elected to the Reichstag. Next came his appointment as Gauleiter of Vienna on 22 May 1938 by Adolf Hitler.

In his early tenure as Gauleiter, Globocnik espoused Nazi anti-Jewish philosophy: "I will not recoil from radical interventions for the solution of Jewish questions." Later that same year he opened Vienna's first anti-Semitic political exhibition, which was attended by 10,000 visitors on the first day. Prominent at the exhibition and received enthusiastically by the public was the film, "The Eternal Jew".
 
Early gestures of accommodation to the new government by Cardinal Innitzer did not assuage the Austrian Nazi radicals, foremost among them being Globocnik. He launched a crusade against the Church, and the Nazis confiscated property, closed Catholic organisations and sent many priests to Dachau. Anger at the treatment of the Church in Austria grew quickly, and in October 1938 the first act of overt mass resistance to the new regime took place. A rally of thousands left Mass in Vienna chanting "Christ is our Führer", before being dispersed by police. A Nazi mob ransacked Cardinal Innitzer's residence, after he denounced Nazi persecution of the Church.

Globocnik was relieved of his posts and stripped of his party honours on 30 January 1939, when it was discovered that he was involved in illegal foreign currency speculation. As punishment, Himmler transferred Globocnik to the Waffen-SS, in the rank of junior sergeant (Unterscharführer), where he served with SS Standarte "Germania" during the Polish campaign. Himmler liked Globocnik and recognised the value of the Austrian. In late 1939, Globocnik was pardoned, promoted to SS-Brigadeführer, and assigned to Lublin province.

Crimes in occupied Poland
On 9 November 1939, Himmler appointed Globocnik as SS and Police Leader in the Lublin district of the General Government territory. After the initially disappointing party career, Globocnik now had a second chance in the ranks of the SS and the police. On 16 February 1940, Globocnik declared: "The evacuated Jews should feed themselves and be supported by their countrymen, as these Jews have enough [food]. If this does not succeed, one should let them starve."

In the following years, Globocnik was responsible for:
'Liquidating' the Warsaw Ghetto, which contained about 500,000 Jews, the largest Jewish community in Europe and the second-largest in the world after New York City.
Liquidating the Białystok Ghetto, which had strongly resisted German occupation.
Resettling a large number of Poles under the premise of 'ethnic cleansing'.
Implementation and supervision of the Lublin reservation, to which 95,000 Jews were deported, with its adjacent network of forced labour camps in the Lublin district. He was also in charge of over 45,000 Jewish labourers.

Extermination camps

There are indications that Globocnik, along with a chief accomplice Christian Wirth, may have originated the concept of the extermination camp and industrialised murder, and suggested the concept to Himmler. At a two-hour meeting with Himmler on 13 October 1941, Globocnik received verbal approval to begin construction of the Belzec extermination camp, the first such camp in the General Government. Shortly beforehand, in September 1941, Globocnik had been visited by Philipp Bouhler and Viktor Brack, the top officials in the Fuhrer Chancellery responsible for the Aktion T4 "euthanasia" program, which had been using gas chambers disguised as shower rooms to execute many of its victims.  On or about 1 October 1941, Globocnik wrote a memorandum to Himmler containing proposals for actions against the Jews "of a security policy nature," and the 13 October meeting was held to discuss this memorandum and related subjects.

A colleague's contemporaneous letter reflects Globocnik's state of mind at the time of the 13 October meeting: Globocnik said it was necessary to undertake a "cleansing of the entire [General Government] of Jews and Poles" and was "full of good and far-reaching plans" to achieve this objective.  There are indications that Globocnik may have begun a crude experimental gassing facility in the woods near Belzec shortly before his mid-October meeting with Himmler. At the 13 October 1941 meeting with Himmler, Globocnik proposed exterminating the Jews in assembly-line fashion in a concentration camp, using gas chambers. On 14 October 1941 – the day after he had met with Globocnik – Himmler held a five-hour meeting with Reinhard Heydrich to discuss "executions", following which other extermination camp gassing sites were built.  Days later, Himmler forbade all further Jewish emigration from Reich territory "in view of the forthcoming 'Final Solution' to the Jewish question."
    
The gassing facilities that Globocnik established at Belzec soon after his 13 October meeting with Himmler were designed by T4 programme personnel assigned to him. They used carbon monoxide, as the T4 programme had done. Before it became an extermination camp, Belzec had been part of Himmler's and Globocnik's Burggraben project. The construction of three more death camps, Sobibor and Majdanek in the Lublin district and Treblinka at Małkinia Górna, followed in 1942. Globocnik was complicit in the extermination of more than 1.5 million Jews of Polish, Czech, Dutch, French, Russian, Slovak, German, Portuguese, Turkish, Spanish and Austrian origin, as well as a smaller number of non-Jews, in the death camps under his control.

He exploited Jews and non-Jews as slave labourers in his own forced labour camps. He was responsible for seizing the properties and valuables of murdered inmates while in charge of Operation Reinhard. Although other arms of the Nazi state were also involved in the overall management of the greater concentration camp system, Globocnik had control over the Aktion Reinhard camps, and any orders that he received came directly from Himmler. From 1942 to 1943, he also oversaw the beginning of the Generalplan Ost, the plan to expel Poles from their lands and resettle those territories with German settlers (see Zamość Uprising). On 9 November 1942, Globocnik was promoted to SS-Gruppenführer and Generalleutnant der Polizei.

Activities in Italy
After the Armistice of Cassibile, Globocnik was appointed as Higher SS and Police Leader of the Operational Zone of the Adriatic Littoral of Italy on 13 September 1943.

After the completion of Operation Reinhard in Poland, he was sent to Trieste, his hometown. 

Having looted assets stolen from Holocaust victims at death camps in occupied Poland, Globocnik went to Italy with a number of his men who had taken part in Aktion Tiergarten 4 including Franz Stangl from Treblinka and Franz Reichleitner from Sobibor. A few days after 8 September 1943, Christian Wirth arrived in Trieste. Together, they converted an old rice mill on the outskirts of the city into a detention centre complete with a crematorium, known as Risiera di San Sabba (in Slovene: Rižarna). At San Sabba, thousands of Italian Jews, partisans and other political dissidents were interrogated, tortured and murdered under the direction of these men after the 1943 downfall of Benito Mussolini and the German takeover of the country.

In Slovene Littoral, Slovene Partisans were fought both by Germans and by the Littoral Home Guard, which was also under Globocnik's direct command. It provided Germans with lists of locations of Liberation Front of the Slovene Nation hideouts and suspicious individuals (described as propagandists).

With the advance of Allied troops, Globocnik retreated into Austrian Carinthia and finally went into hiding high in the mountains near Weissensee, still in the company of his closest staff members.

Death
Globocnik was tracked down and captured by a British armoured cavalry unit on 31 May 1945 in Carinthia, Austria. A unit from the 4th Queen's Own Hussars, found him on the Möslacher Alm, a  mountain in the Eastern Alps, with seven other wanted Nazis including Georg Michalsen, Friedrich Rainer, Ernst Lerch, Hermann Höfle, Karl Hellesberger, Hugo Herzog and Friedrich Plöb. Globocnik was taken to Paternion in Villach-Land District to be interrogated. However, before he was questioned, Globocnik committed suicide by biting on a cyanide capsule.

His body was taken to be buried in a local churchyard, but the priest reportedly refused to have "the body of such a man" resting in consecrated ground. A grave was dug outside the churchyard, next to an outer wall, and the body was buried without ceremony.

Despite contemporary photographs of Globocnik's corpse and reliable reports, such as the Regimental Diary and Field Reports of the 4th Queen's Own Hussars, detailing the circumstances of his capture and suicide, urban legends suggested he survived the war, or that circumstances of his death differed. Prior to the 1980s, there was debate over the circumstances of Globocnik's survival; some had speculated that his death in either early May or June 1945 was at the hands of either partisans or a Jewish revenge squad. A false version of Globocnik's fate has circulated that says he was turned over to U.S. intelligence by the British. This is based on an "official US document signed by US CIC S/A Operations Officer Andrew L. Venters, dated 27 October 1948, more than three years after his supposed death". However, this document was exposed as a forgery in the 1980s by the investigative writer and historian, Gitta Sereny; she gives all details in a long article in The Observer newspaper.

Portrayal in media
Globocnik is a key antagonist in the Robert Harris alternative-history novel Fatherland; by 1964, he is still alive and a top SS official.

References

Further reading

External links

1904 births
1945 suicides
Ethnic Slovene people
Holocaust perpetrators in Poland
Military personnel from Trieste
Austrian people of Croatian descent
Austrian people of Serbian descent
Austrian people of Slovenian descent
Nazis
Nazis from outside Germany
Einsatzgruppen personnel
Gauleiters
Members of the Reichstag of Nazi Germany
Nazi persecution of the Catholic Church
Nazis who committed suicide in Austria
Suicides by cyanide poisoning
Nazis who committed suicide in prison custody
People from Austrian Littoral
Prisoners who died in British military detention
Operation Reinhard
Recipients of German pardons
SS and Police Leaders
Waffen-SS personnel
SS-Gruppenführer